The Festungsbahn is a funicular railway providing access to Hohensalzburg Fortress in Salzburg municipality in Austria. It links the fortress with Festungsgasse, below the northern side of the fortress's walls. The Festungsbahn opened in 1892, and should not be confused with the much older Reisszug line that provides goods access to the castle.

The line is operated by Salzburg AG, who also operate the city's buses and the Salzburger Lokalbahn.

History

The Festungsbahn opened in 1892 as a water balance funicular operated by the Salzburger Eisenbahn- und Tramwaygesellschaft. Previously used as barracks, the line made the fortress available to a broader range of visitors.

The line was rebuilt with new cars and an electric drive in 1960, whilst the lower and upper stations were rebuilt in 1975 and 1976 respectively. In 1991 the line was again modernised, with the provision of new cars with an increased passenger capacity and a faster line speed.

Between January and April 2011, the funicular was again modernized, at a cost of €4 million. Two new vehicles were provided and the electrical equipment replaced. Panoramic windows offer a better view of the city.

Operation

The line operates every day from 09:00. The time of the last car varies from 17:00 to 22:00 depending on the time of year.

The line has the following technical parameters:

See also
Salzburg S-Bahn

References

External links

 Page on the Festungsbahn from the Salzburg AG's web site (in German) 
 Article on the Festungsbahn from Funimag
 Video footage of the railway

Rail transport in Salzburg
Railway lines in Austria
Funicular railways in Austria
Former water-powered funicular railways converted to electricity
1040 mm gauge railways in Austria
Railway lines opened in 1892